Autistica is a UK based charity engaged in funding and campaigning for research on autism and related conditions. Its research strategy is focused on improving the understanding of mental health, physical health, language and epilepsy in autism.

About Autistica

Autistica was founded in 2004 by entrepreneur and philanthropist Dame Stephanie Shirley. They initially operated as a UK partner to the US charity Autism Speaks. The link with the US parent was severed on 1 January 2010. Autistica is registered in and operates throughout England and Wales.

Autistica funds medical research to understand the causes of autism, improve diagnosis, and develop new treatments and interventions. They are the UK’s leading autism medical research charity.

Their current scientific priorities are to:

 Bring down the average age of diagnosis and develop early interventions that can improve the outlook of autistic people.
 Improve the quality of life for young people and autistic adults by understanding the additional physical and mental health issues that many individuals experience and ensure the development of effective treatments.
 Support autistic adults by improving the understanding of how autism changes over the lifespan and making sure that adult-specific needs are addressed.
The mission and goals of Autistica are distinct from those of the UK-based National Autistic Society (NAS). While Autistica concentrates its efforts on research into the causes and treatments of autism, with a view to reduce the age of diagnosis, provide effective, evidence-based treatments for people with ASD, particularly co-occurring problems, including epilepsy, attention deficit hyperactivity disorder (ADHD) and severe maladaptive behaviors (SMB) and researching autism and ageing, the NAS focuses on the service needs of autistic individuals.

Funding policy 
Autistica uses a peer review process to make sure that the science they fund is of the highest quality. They are members of the Association of Medical Research Charities (AMRC) which reflects the rigor of their funding process. Final funding decisions are made with the guidance of Autistica’s Scientific Review Panel made up of the top UK and international researchers.

Fundraising
In 2009, Autistica provided a total of £940,000 to its beneficiaries in autism research.

Notable members and participants
 Professor Sir Michael Rutter
 Stephanie Shirley
 Michael Fitzpatrick
 Bridget Ogilvie
 Dr. Ann Olivarius

References

External links
 Autistica web site

Autism-related organisations in the United Kingdom
2004 establishments in the United Kingdom
Organizations established in 2004
Charities for disabled people based in the United Kingdom